Koski may refer to
Villages in Poland
Brulino-Koski
Długołęka-Koski
Humięcino-Koski
Koski Duże
Koski Pierwsze
Koski-Wypychy

Municipalities in Finland
Hämeenkoski
Koski Tl

Other
Koski (surname)
Koski Glacier in Antarctica